{{Speciesbox
| name = Montezuma's cattleheart
| image = ParidesmontezumaMale.JPG
| status =
| taxon = Parides montezuma
| authority = (Westwood, 1842) <ref>Westwood, 1842 Arcana entomologica, or Illustrations of new, rare and interesting Insects</ref>
| synonyms =
}}Parides montezuma, the Montezuma's cattleheart, is a butterfly in the family Papilionidae. It is native to the Americas.

Description
The upperside of the wings is black, without a band and with one row of red crescents along the hindwing margin. The underside of the wings is almost the same as the upperside.Lewis, H. L., 1974 Butterflies of the World  Page 26, figure 15 A full description is provided by Rothschild, W. and Jordan, K. (1906)

It is rare in Costa Rica, being more common northward. It is not threatened.

Host plants
 Aristolochia acanthophylla Aristolochia foetida – Jalisco Dutchman's pipe
 Aristolochia grandiflora – pelican flower
 Aristolochia micrantha Aristolochia orbicularisParides montezuma is a member of the ascanius species group ("Fringe-spots white. Hindwing with submarginal spots and usnally also diseal spots or dots, or a discal band ;mostly with tail") A quadrate whitish spot in space 2 of the forewings is quite peculiar of the ascanius groupThe members areParides agavus (Drury, 1782)Parides alopius (Godman & Salvin, [1890]) Parides ascanius (Cramer, [1775]) Parides bunichus (Hübner, [1821])Parides gundlachianus (C. & R. Felder, 1864) Parides montezuma (Westwood, 1842) Parides phalaecus (Hewitson, 1869)Parides photinus (Doubleday, 1844) Parides proneus'' (Hübner, [1831])

Etymology
The specific epithet honours the Aztec king Montezuma.

References

External links

 

montezuma
Butterflies of Central America
Butterflies of North America